Ong Valley is a mainly ice-free valley 5 nautical miles (9 km) long, just west of Kreiling Mesa in the Miller Range. Named by Advisory Committee on Antarctic Names (US-ACAN) for John S. Ong, United States Antarctic Research Program (USARP) traverse engineer on the South Pole Traverse (1962–63). The opening of the valley is buttressed by a sidelobe of the Argosy Glacier and the valley floor is covered with patterned ground polygons.

Valleys of Oates Land